Howard Jordan is the former Chief of the Oakland Police Department. Jordan was appointed Interim Chief by Mayor Jean Quan in October 2011 after the resignation of Chief Anthony Batts.  The appointment was made permanent the following February.  Prior to his appointment as Chief, Jordan had accrued over twenty years experience as a member of the Oakland Police Department.

Jordan had previously served as Interim Chief in 2009 following the resignation of Wayne Tucker.

Jordan announced his retirement due to medical reasons on May 8, 2013. Assistant Chief Anthony Toribio became the department's interim chief in accordance with department policy, replaced by Sean Whent only two days later.

References

Law enforcement workers from California
Year of birth missing (living people)
Living people
Chiefs of the Oakland Police Department